Elections to Castlereagh Borough Council were held on 21 May 1997 on the same day as the other Northern Irish local government elections. The election used four district electoral areas to elect a total of 23 councillors.

Election results

Note: "Votes" are the first preference votes.

Districts summary

|- class="unsortable" align="centre"
!rowspan=2 align="left"|Ward
! % 
!Cllrs
! % 
!Cllrs
! %
!Cllrs
! %
!Cllrs
! % 
!Cllrs
! % 
!Cllrs
!rowspan=2|TotalCllrs
|- class="unsortable" align="center"
!colspan=2 bgcolor="" | DUP
!colspan=2 bgcolor="" | UUP
!colspan=2 bgcolor="" | Alliance
!colspan=2 bgcolor="" | SDLP
!colspan=2 bgcolor="" | UKUP
!colspan=2 bgcolor="white"| Others
|-
|align="left"|Castlereagh Central
|bgcolor="#D46A4C"|58.7
|bgcolor="#D46A4C"|3
|17.0
|1
|14.6
|1
|4.4
|0
|5.3
|1
|0.0
|0
|6
|-
|align="left"|Castlereagh East
|bgcolor="#D46A4C"|53.0
|bgcolor="#D46A4C"|4
|11.1
|1
|18.9
|1
|0.0
|0
|0.0
|0
|17.0
|1
|7
|-
|align="left"|Castlereagh South
|27.4
|1
|bgcolor="40BFF5"|31.2
|bgcolor="40BFF5"|2
|23.9
|1
|17.5
|1
|0.0
|0
|0.0
|0
|5
|-
|align="left"|Castlereagh West
|bgcolor="#D46A4C"|35.4
|bgcolor="#D46A4C"|2
|21.2
|1
|17.4
|1
|12.9
|1
|0.0
|0
|13.1
|0
|5
|- class="unsortable" class="sortbottom" style="background:#C9C9C9"
|align="left"| Total
|44.2
|10
|19.6
|5
|18.7
|4
|8.2
|2
|1.3
|1
|8.0
|1
|23
|-
|}

Districts results

Castlereagh Central

1993: 4 x DUP, 1 x Alliance, 1 x UUP, 1 x Independent Unionist
1997: 4 x DUP, 1 x Alliance, 1 x UUP, 1 x UKUP
1993-1997 Change: Independent Unionist joins UKUP

Castlereagh East

1993: 3 x DUP, 1 x Alliance, 1 x UUP, 1 x UPUP, 1 x Independent Unionist
1997: 4 x DUP, 1 x Alliance, 1 x UUP, 1 x Independent Unionist
1993-1997 Change: UPUP joins DUP

Castlereagh South

1993: 2 x UUP, 2 x Alliance, 1 x DUP
1997: 2 x UUP, 1 x Alliance, 1 x DUP, 1 x SDLP
1993-1997 Change: SDLP gain from Alliance

Castlereagh West

1993: 2 x UUP, 2 x DUP, 1 x Alliance
1997: 2 x DUP, 1 x UUP, 1 x Alliance, 1 x SDLP
1993-1997 Change: SDLP gain from UUP

References

Castlereagh Borough Council elections
Castlereagh